Golam Faruq Ovi is an independent politician and former Member of Parliament of Bangladesh.

Career
Ovi was elected to Parliament from Barisal-2 constituency as a Jatiya Party (Ershad) candidate in 1996.  Being the youngest MP of the 7th Parliament, he attracted national attention by being vocal about contemporary issues during his tenure.  He was against the decision made by Jatiya Party to join the Bangladesh Nationalist Party led alliance which was why he was expelled from the party. In 2016, he moved to India and tried to file nomination papers with the Bangladesh Election Commission through his lawyer as an independent candidate.

Alleged charge 
In 2010, Ovi was charged by Bangladesh Police with the unusual death of Syeda Tania Mahbub Tinni, who was a Bangladeshi model and actress born in Wari, Dhaka. According to court sources, the defendant's lawyer has said in court that it was a suicide that has been turned into a homicide for political reasons.

References 

Jatiya Party politicians
7th Jatiya Sangsad members
Year of birth missing (living people)
People from Barisal District
Living people